Sonja Becq (born 8 December 1957 in Duffel) is a Belgian politician and a federal representative since 2007 (for the constituency Brussels-Halle-Vilvoorde). She is a member of the Flemish Christian-democratic party (CD&V).

Career
1995–2004: Member of the Flemish Parliament
2007–present: Member of the Chamber of Representatives (Federal parliament)

References

1957 births
Living people
Members of the Belgian Federal Parliament
21st-century Belgian politicians
21st-century Belgian women politicians